Heather Gordon Haldane is a Canadian television producer. She is a co-founder of Screen Door Productions, Inc. with Mary Young Leckie. She was executive producer of the TV series MVP, and also worked on Shattered City: The Halifax Explosion and Prom Queen: The Marc Hall Story. In 1988 she produced Where the Spirit Lives.

External links 
 

Canadian television producers
Canadian women television producers
Year of birth missing (living people)
Living people
Place of birth missing (living people)